HM Prison Frankland is a Category A men's prison located in the village of Brasside in County Durham, England. Frankland is operated by His Majesty's Prison Service.

History
Frankland was originally opened in 1983 with four wings each holding 108 in single cells. A further two wings opened in 1998 to an open gallery design to hold an additional 206. A specialist Dangerous and Severe Personality Disorder (DSPD) unit opened at the prison in May 2004.

The prison has increased in size in recent years following major redevelopment work including the construction of the new DSPD 'Westgate Unit'. In March 2008, the Ministry of Justice announced that Frankland would be expanded again, with planning permission being granted for an extra 120 places at the prison.

In 2011, two convicted prisoners, Nathan Mann and Michael Parr, disemboweled 23-year-old Mitchell Harrison, who had been convicted of raping a 13-year-old girl.

Facilities
Frankland is a Dispersal prison that holds male prisoners who are over 21 years of age, and whose sentence is usually 4 years or more, life sentences and high-risk remand prisoners. The prison has been dubbed the "Monster Mansion" due to many of its inmates being convicted murderers, high-risk sex offenders and those convicted of terrorism-related offences. Prison accommodation is divided between wings, with wings A to D holding 108 inmates each, wings F and G holding an additional 208, with J holding 120. All cells are single occupancy.

The Healthcare Centre at the prison consists of a 4-bedded ward and 10 furnished rooms, a dental suite, X-ray and a Suicide Crisis Suite. A number of clinics are held, many conducted by visiting specialists. There are also telehealth services and wing-based treatment rooms. Primary care is contracted to the County Durham & Darlington Foundation Trust.

Education at the prison is provided by The Manchester College, with a range of courses provided - from basic skills to higher education level. Frankland also runs workshops in furniture production, a charity workshop and a sight-and-sound workshop. The prison has a library and gym to support inmates' learning and recreation.

Frankland Prison has a visitors' centre. Facilities include a canteen and children's play area, all with disabled access.

Notable prisoners

Former inmates
 Kamel Bourgass
 Charles Bronson
 Paul John Ferris
 Adam Johnson
 Kieran Patrick Kelly
 Andrzej Kunowski
 Dominic Noonan
 Colin Pitchfork
 Harold Shipman
 John Straffen
 Peter Sutcliffe

Current inmates
Michael Adebolajo
Dhiren Barot
Levi Bellfield
David Bieber
Peter Chapman
David Copeland
Wayne Couzens
Mark Dixie
John Duffy
Benjamin Geen
Delroy Grant
Ian Huntley

Yusuf Jama
Thomas Mair
Stuart Morgan
Colin Norris
Hussain Osman
Muzzaker Shah
Michael Stone
Charles Taylor
Curtis Warren

David Fuller

References

External links

 Ministry of Justice pages on Frankland
 HMP Frankland - HM Inspectorate of Prisons Reports

Frankland
Prisons in County Durham
Buildings and structures in Durham, England
1980 establishments in England
Frankland
Dispersal prisons